Mass Effect 3 is an action role-playing video game and the third installment of the Mass Effect video game series, developed by BioWare and published by Electronic Arts (EA). Upon its release March 6, 2012 for the PlayStation 3, Xbox 360, and Microsoft Windows, Mass Effect 3 generated controversy. Its ending was poorly received by players who felt that it did not meet their expectations. On June 26, 2012, developers released an Extended Cut as downloadable content (DLC) intended to clarify the endings and remedy fan concerns. The initial announcement of the development of add-on content to amend the ending as well as the subsequent release of  Extended Cut sparked debates over the treatment of video games as art and whether BioWare should have to alter their vision of the work in response to external pressure, regardless of its quality. Both BioWare and EA have been criticized for questionable business practices over the release of Mass Effect 3: From Ashes as paid DLC on the same date as the base game's launch and the casting of Jessica Chobot, a video game media personality who was affiliated with video game journalist websites IGN and G4TV at the time, as non-player character Diana Allers. The inclusion of expanded LGBT content with full-fledged romance options, the creative decision to utilize a stock photo as the basis of popular companion character Tali'Zorah's face, and an online poll to determine the redesigned appearance of the female version of player character Commander Shepard for Mass Effect 3 have also provoked controversy.

Ending of Mass Effect 3

Background
In the original Mass Effect trilogy, players assume the role of Commander Shepard, a customizable avatar who leads allies from across the Milky Way galaxy in a struggle against a collective of powerful synthetic lifeforms called the Reapers, who harvest the galaxy of sentient spacefaring life every 50,000 years. By the events of Mass Effect 3, the Reapers have arrived in the galaxy and begin harvesting entire worlds. To stop them, Shepard must form an alliance between all of Mass Effects alien races to build the Crucible, a megastructure built from blueprints designed by the civilizations from previous cycles, including the Protheans, which can theoretically destroy the Reapers.

As Shepard, players dispatch a final "Marauder" enemy, entering a Reaper teleportation beam on Earth to reach the Citadel and begin the game's ending sequence. This follows a long and grueling battle in London where Shepard is gravely wounded by Harbinger, the leader of the Reapers. Once there, Shepard engages in a dialog-based final showdown with the Illusive Man, the leader of Cerberus, which inevitably leads to the latter's death. Shepard then attempts to fire off the Crucible, only to be transported to the Citadel's pinnacle. They encounter the Catalyst, an artificial intelligence with the appearance of a child, that declares itself to be the creator of the Reapers. The being says that the Reapers' job is to exterminate intelligent races that have reached the capability of creating artificial lifeforms such as the geth, because artificial life will eventually destroy natural life if allowed to proliferate.

Having conceded defeat to Shepard, it presents up to three options for activating the Crucible, which will break the Reapers' galactic cycle of extinction:
 Destroy the Reapers and all other synthetic life, including allies such as EDI and the geth.
 Control the Reapers by copying Shepard's influence into a new artificial intelligence, creating a galactic peacekeeping force.
 Synthesize all organic and synthetic life, which should result in both life forms achieving perfect understanding of one another.

By making any of the above choices, Shepard activates the Crucible, which emits a wave of energy that spreads throughout the galaxy via the mass relays, damaging them in the process. As the Normandy is hit by the wave of energy, it crashes on a remote planet.

Response

Although Mass Effect 3 launched in early March 2012 to a predominantly positive critical reception, its endings received a very poor reception from players. By mid-March 2012, a contingent of displeased fans had organized an internet campaign called "Retake Mass Effect" to demand a better ending to the game, part of which included a charity drive for the organization Child's Play. The drive raised $80,000 in less than two weeks before it was stopped. One fan made a complaint to the Federal Trade Commission, arguing that BioWare did not deliver on the promise of its game. Although the director of marketplace services for the Better Business Bureau publicly supported allegations about the purported false advertising of meaningful player choices, in June 2012 the UK Advertising Standards Authority ruled that EA and BioWare were not guilty of false advertisement since the endings were "thematically quite different", and the choices and Readiness Rating reflected in the ending content were significant enough to avoid actionable misleading of consumers under existing law.

Opinions over the game's endings divided many critics. Among the criticisms include the ending rendering character choices inconsequential; a general lack of closure; lore contradictions and plot holes; character and narrative inconsistencies; the absence of a final boss battle; and inconsistencies between statements by BioWare staff during the game's development and the form the endings ultimately took. Commentators took note of the magnitude and scale of the public reaction and highlighted how invested the series had made its players. A widely discussed fan theory proposed that the base game's endings were a hallucinated consequence of Shepard's gradual, forcible Reaper indoctrination over the course of the trilogy, also positing that the "Destroy" ending was purposely colored red to dissuade Shepard from picking it, and thus, overcoming the mind control. Dissatisfied fans also turned the final enemy unit encountered in combat into a sarcastic Internet meme called Marauder Shields.

By March 16, 2012, project director Casey Hudson and community coordinator Chris Priestly acknowledged the growing controversy and provided assurances that the team were listening to feedback, though Hudson defended the polarizing ending whereas Priestly noted that they were waiting for the right time to respond. Hudson later went on record and conceded that players ought to have more closure and answers for the creative direction they had taken. BioWare co-founder Ray Muzyka later announced that the company planned to address the criticism, with a further announcement to be made in April 2012. On April 5, BioWare announced a free downloadable content pack that would expand upon the ending. Some commentators expressed concerns that changing the endings by giving into fan demand would compromise the developers' creative vision as well as the artistic integrity of their work, and ultimately sets a bad precedent for the development of creative works in the video game industry. Video game developer Ken Levine remarked that he felt sad that players were fervently calling for a revised Mass Effect 3 ending as they would be left “disappointed”. Others like Stephen Totilo from Kotaku welcomed BioWare's decision to be open towards revising the ending to their work.

The expansion, Extended Cut, was released for most platforms on June 26, 2012.  The pack supplements each ending with additional cutscenes during the ending sequence, and a montage-based epilogue. The epilogue elaborates upon other aspects of the conclusion and elaborates on the aftermath of Shepard's actions, such as the fates of various supporting characters, alien species and entire worlds, all of are variable based on prior narrative choices made by players along with their accumulated "Effective Military Strength" (EMS) score. Extended Cut also provides an additional choice for players to refuse the offer and have Shepard attack the Catalyst, which results in the Crucible not being activated and an inevitable Reaper victory over the current cycle of organics. Following the release of the Extended Cut pack, Mike Fahey from Kotaku observed that fan reaction was generally mixed, although certain individuals like the FTC complainant expressed satisfaction with the reworked ending sequences it introduced. Video game publications were similarly divided, with some critics such as Joe Juba of Game Informer describing the new additions as a "substantial improvement" over the original ending, while others such as Paul Tassi of Forbes felt it was "too little, far too late."

Aftermath

Retrospective discussions of Mass Effect 3 inevitably involve attention towards its ending. James Davenport of PC Gamer opined that the game's ending received an "inordinate" amount of criticism, which distracts players from the other positive or exemplary aspects of Mass Effect 3. Forbes contributor Erik Kain took the view that the public outcry and the subsequent response from BioWare and EA "may end up being a healthy one for the industry, opening a new chapter in gamer/developer/publisher relations", and called the release Extended Edition as a complementary expansion to the original endings a "remarkable" choice that made gamers realize "that they are entitled, and that it isn't a bad thing, to quality games". In 2018, Lucy O'Brien from IGN concurred and remarked that fan-driven internet campaigns like "Retake Mass Effect" have contributed to a paradigm shift in how consumers influence video game developers. With the inclusion of Mass Effect 3 and its DLC content into the Mass Effect Legendary Edition compilation released in 2021, BioWare staff are hopeful that following the passage of time and the release of Legendary Edition, players would reassess their opinion about the ending as the culmination of the trilogy's overarching story arc.

The Consumerist suggested that the ending controversy of Mass Effect 3 was a significant contribution to EA being named Worst Company in America two years in a row between 2012 and 2013 for a recurring poll it organized. Remarking that the public outcry "was so negative and so widely publicized", Chris Morran from The Consumerist suggested that the development of the game's multiplayer came at the expense of a satisfactory ending, and that players were left "with an empty feeling after reaching the obviously rushed endgame".

Day-One DLC
The decision to release Mass Effect 3: From Ashes as paid downloadable content (DLC) alongside the launch of the base game was criticized by players. Shortly after the pack's release, one player uploaded a video on YouTube with alleged proof that the contents of From Ashes are included on the disc but deliberately withheld by the publisher unless an additional amount of money to access the content is paid, even though work has been completed prior to the release date. Several BioWare staff members, including Hudson and Gamble, publicly defended the business practice. At the 2012 Game Developers Conference (GDC), game designer and former BioWare staff Christina Norman implored players to judge the DLC based on the quality of its content as opposed to the timing of its release. Electronic Arts eventually responded with a press release, and clarified that for the player to access the contents of the pack, an additional download of about 600 megabytes in size that is not on the disc is required.

Wes Fenlon from PC Gamer noted that it reflects poorly on the developers that the one character who could offer significant insight into a pivotal element of the Mass Effect universe was locked behind a paywall, even if he is not essential to the main plot. The presence of Day-One DLC in many of the video games EA published was identified as a factor behind its placement as the "worst company in America" in 2012 according to polling held by Consumerist.

Tali's face

Tali'Zorah, or simply Tali, is a companion or squadmate of Commander Shepard in Mass Effect 3. One of the most popular characters throughout the original trilogy, her face is perpetually obscured by her helmet; players could only see a vague glimpse of her facial features within the series' game engine. BioWare's position on whether to reveal her face was a long-standing internal debate, and the developers announced they were still unsure during Mass Effect 3s development. Concept artist Matt Rhodes felt it would interesting to see how players compared her personality to her appearance, and how they would respond to an appearance that challenged their expectations as "a little too alien, just a little too repellent". They were aware that either decision would likely annoy some people, and that no reveal could universally fit all views of Tali. BioWare wished to unveil her face in a "tasteful way" outside of the game engine, and decided that a gift from Tali would be the best way. A stock photo of Miss England model Hammasa Kohistani was used to ensure the face's closeness to a real photograph.

The reveal of Tali's unmasked face as part of the culmination of her Mass Effect 3 romance was met with widespread criticism from fans, who believed that the use of an existing image showed a lack of effort on the part of the developers, who were unwilling to spend the money to hire a model for the role. IGN described it as one of the series' biggest controversies. Conversely, GameZone's Matt Liebl felt that the issue was not as big as fans had made it out to be.

In the 2021 Mass Effect Legendary Edition compilation, BioWare addressed the criticism by removing the modified photograph of Kohistani and replacing it with a unique computer-generated humanoid face with all-white eyes. Overall, fan reception towards the change has been positive, although it was also met with disappointment from some quarters that the developers opted to maintain her human-like appearance rather than making her appear more alien.

Portrayal of homosexuality
The inclusion of full-fledged same sex romance options in Mass Effect 3 provoked backlash from some players and special interest groups. Kotaku published an article on May 16, 2011, less than a day after developer Casey Hudson's announcement about the game's incorporation of same-sex romances, reporting that some players have spoken out over their concerns that characters like Kaidan Alenko having undergone "implausible and abrupt sexual transformations" at the expense of "narrative consistency and integrity". Shortly after the release of Mass Effect 3, a YouTube video which shows an intimate scene between a male Commander Shepherd and Steve Cortez, an openly gay crew member of The Normandy, provoked an outcry among some players. Kevin VanOrd from GameSpot and Craig Takeuchi from the Georgia Straight highlighted instances of dismissive comments against the game's same-sex relationship content which were posted on several websites in their respective articles. VanOrd in particular noted that he was targeted for personal attacks about his sexual orientation on social media in retaliation to his review of Mass Effect 3. Queerty suggested that some of the user-generated comments posted on review aggregator Metacritic were indicative of a review bomb movement to intentionally lower the game's user rating in response to the romance content.

In April 2012, Jeff Brown, VP of corporate communications at EA, claimed that his company was inundated by "several thousand" letters and emails protesting the inclusion of LGBT content in the video games it publishes like Mass Effect 3. EA issued a statement denying that it came under pressure by any groups to include LGBT characters in their games, but acknowledged that it has voluntarily worked with pro-LGBT groups to discuss appropriate content as well as the harassment of players in online forums. James Brightman from Gameindustry.biz noted that many of the letters appeared to have originated from addresses in the US State of Florida and were likely coordinated by local anti-LGBT groups based there.

Several commentators concluded that the backlash was primarily driven by disapproval over the unprecedented depiction of male homosexuality in the series. Andreas Blüml observed that lesbian or pseudo-lesbian options for female characters was in fact the norm throughout the trilogy, whereas the inclusion of same-sex options for male characters in Mass Effect 3 is the anomaly and started what the media termed a "gay controversy" in the United States.

Redesign of Commander Shepard 
The default appearance for Commander Shepard's female version, colloquially known as "FemShep", underwent a design overhaul for Mass Effect 3. Six different designs for the default female Shepard were hosted online via the official Mass Effect Facebook page, and fans were asked to vote for whichever design they preferred, not only as the standard in-game model but also as part of the game's marketing efforts like trailers and box art. BioWare staff made many different designs before narrowing the choice down to the six options for the poll. The blonde Shepard with freckles won what was described as a controversial popularity poll; while commentators like Kirk Hamilton from Kotaku accepted what he perceived to be a legitimately democratic choice, others like Kim Richards from PC Gamer rejected the outcome and criticized the poll for encouraging players to go for the most Barbie-like conventionally attractive appearance. BioWare later decided that the hairstyle promoted in the poll may have interfered with the vote, and so made another competition to decide that. The red-haired Shepard won the subsequent competition.

In retrospect, Carlen Lavigne's analysis of the controversy concluded that the poll was presented like a beauty contest, which positioned Shepard in a sexualized manner for the pleasure of a straight male audience; this has a corrupting effect on Shepard's standing as a feminist lead, even though the original intention is to promote a female character as the face of the franchise. Leandro Lima noted that the manner in which Shepard was included within the marketing campaign for Mass Effect 3 was still problematic for many players, as she is "perceived as very generic in terms of design". Patricia Hernandez from Polygon felt that the manner which the female Shepard poll unfolded was "strange" and that BioWare's attempts to continue modifying her years after the release of the first game while her male counterpart's appearance remains unchanged is somewhat "off-putting", but expressed relief that "in 2021, there’s no vote, no massive fan campaign to get BioWare to even consider highlighting FemShep" in response to her prominence in the promotional material for Mass Effect Legendary Edition.

Involvement of Jessica Chobot

Jessica Chobot voiced news reporter Diana Allers in the 2012 video game Mass Effect 3. Chobot and the media organizations she worked for at the time had previously made it known that she would not review the game in any official capacity. While she had access to a blog hosted by IGN, Chobot maintained that she was never a professional writer for IGN or reviewer for G4, but rather her role is that of a host or entertainer.

Kevin VanOrd from GameSpot was unimpressed with the sexualized presentation of Chobot's character as well as her acting ability, suggesting that her involvement "seem more like a calculated marketing ploy than a union of creative talents". Forbes contributor Erik Kain noted that Chobot had previously previewed Mass Effect 3 on G4TV and had openly admitted that she was a BioWare fan. Writing for The Escapist, Dennis Scimeca acknowledged that while many individuals do assume overlapping roles in the field of video game journalism, he took the view that there are important distinctions to be made between the roles of a journalist, a host and an entertainer. Scimeca explained that both BioWare and Electronic Arts were well within their rights to cast Chobot in Mass Effect 3 in light of her self-described role in the video game industry, and thus her involvement was not ethically inappropriate. In a later interview with Polygon, Chobot emphasized that she is an on-screen personality who never considered herself to be a journalist, and remarked that she was never asked for her side of the story by people who write about her in the press.

Chobot also spoke out in support of the original ending presented in Mass Effect 3 shortly after the game's launch; on April 2, 2012, she issued a public apology on her IGN blog following backlash from some players in response to her choice of tone and words when defending the creative decision behind the ending.

See also
Criticism of Electronic Arts

References

Further reading

External links
 Revisiting Mass Effect's Many Controversies by GameSpot.

BioWare
Electronic Arts
Mass Effect 3
Criticisms of software and websites
Internet memes introduced in 2012
LGBT-related controversies in video games
Mass Effect
Video game controversies
Video game memes